Blandas is a commune in the Gard department in southern France. It is known for its proximity to the Cirque de Navacelles and the town encompasses one of the principal overlooks on the Cirque.  It is also known for its exceptional megalithic sites. It is included in the UNESCO world heritage site "The Causses and the Cévennes, Mediterranean agro-pastoral Cultural Landscape"

Population

History

Prehistoric Finds
La grotte des Pins

In May 1967 a team of speleologists attempted to enlarge a natural opening exposed by erosion. Their work exposed a large hidden room 5m high and on the floor of the room they found fragments of ceramics. Further exploration uncovered tools, objects, and much scattered charcoal, up to 60 cm thick in places possibly from prehistoric torches. Theories at the time suggested that the cave served as a cellar or storage, rather than a habitation, since a lack of air circulation made hearth fires difficult.

Baume du Roc du Midi

In 1979 at Baume du Roc du Midi, a cave which opens out from the cliff on the edge of the causse de Blandas at a lookout with a view over the Cirque de Navacelles, archeologists discovered a walled part of the cave, closed since the Middle Ages, but inhabited continuously from prehistory into protohistoric times. Inside the walled portion, many objects including two copper daggers with serrated blades, a bronze axe, a riveted bronze dagger, bronze sconces, spear-tips, and many other Bronze Age objects

La Baumelle

A discovery was made in 2009 by speleologists in a prehistoric cave which had been blocked for over 5000 years. On August 10, 2009, speleologists, along with Laurent Bruxelles and  Philippe Galant, from Institut national de Recherches archéologiques préventives, began a 10-day exploration of the find. The entrance was blocked by a menhir or stele. This sandstone monolith with engraved surface had been moved from a deposit found at Montdardier 5–6 km from the cave. Prehistoric remains were discovered: skulls, some covered in calcite, pieces of water-collecting vessels, ceramic shards, and a furnished hallway.

Megaliths
see also Mégalithes du causse de Blandas (fr)

See also
Communes of the Gard department
Causse de Blandas
Cirque de Navacelles

References

Communes of Gard